Zlatan Azinović (born 31 January 1988) is a Swedish former professional footballer who played as a goalkeeper.

Career

Kalmar FF
Azinović started his professional career at his home town club Kalmar FF in 2005. He was the second choice behind Petter Wastå and made three appearances for the club in Allsvenskan. In 2010 both Azinović and Wastå were outrivaled by Etrit Berisha.

Trelleborgs FF
In the middle of the 2011 season Azinović went to fellow Allsvenskan club Trelleborgs FF on loan from Kalmar. He made three appearances in his first season at the club. In 2012 Trelleborg decided to fully contract Azinović following his release from Kalmar FF and Trelleborg letting their first choice goalkeeper Viktor Noring go on loan to Malmö FF.

Malmö FF
On 22 August 2012 it was announced that Azinović would transfer to Allsvenskan club Malmö FF with a short-term contract for the rest of the 2012 season. Azinović made no first team appearance for Malmö FF before the end of the season when it was announced that the club would not extend his contract. After a brief spell back at Kalmar Azinović returned to Malmö FF and signed a two-year contract on 9 January 2014. Azinović made two appearances for Malmö FF during the season, in the home fixture against Örebro SK on 13 August 2014 and the final game of the season against Åtvidabergs FF on 1 November 2014. He announced his retirement from professional football in the summer of 2016 following a serious injury.

Coaching career
In August 2016, Azinović was hired as goalkeeper coach at BK Höllviken. Later in September 2016, when the club's manager got fired, Azinović got also the role as assistant manager.

Career statistics
Updated 4 July 2016.

Honours
;Malmö FF
 Allsvenskan: 2014
 Svenska Supercupen: 2014

References

External links
  
 
  (archive)
  (archive)

Living people
1988 births
Swedish footballers
Sweden youth international footballers
Sweden under-21 international footballers
Kalmar FF players
Trelleborgs FF players
Malmö FF players
Ängelholms FF players
Allsvenskan players
Superettan players
Association football goalkeepers
Swedish people of Bosnia and Herzegovina descent
People from Kalmar
Sportspeople from Kalmar County